KOKH-TV (channel 25) is a television station in Oklahoma City, Oklahoma, United States, affiliated with the Fox network. It is owned by Sinclair Broadcast Group alongside CW affiliate KOCB (channel 34). The stations' studios and transmitter facilities are co-located on East Wilshire Boulevard and 78th Street on the city's northeast side.

History

As a non-commercial educational station
On July 25, 1958, while it was in the midst of protracted hearings regarding the predecessor station's bankruptcy, the Republic Television and Radio Company (owner of the allocation's original occupant, ABC affiliate KTVQ, which operated from November 1, 1953, until it was forced off the air by court order on December 15, 1955) donated the construction permit and license to Independent School District No. 89 of Oklahoma County (now Oklahoma City Public Schools). Although the Federal Communications Commission (FCC) reserved the UHF channel 25 allocation in Oklahoma City for commercial broadcasting purposes, the school district proposed upon acquiring the permit to operate it as a non-commercial educational independent station. The district requested for the television station to use the KOKH call letters (standing for its state of license, "Oklahoma") assigned at the time to its public radio station on 88.9 FM (now KYLV).

KOKH-TV first signed on the air on February 2, 1959. The station originally operated from studio facilities based out of the district's Broadcasting Center at the former Classen High School building on North Ellison Avenue and Northwest 17th Street in Oklahoma City's Mesta Park neighborhood (later occupied by the Classen School of Advanced Studies until the district consolidated it with Northeast Academy at that school's campus on Northeast 30th Street and Kelley Avenue in August 2019), which also served as a production facility for National Educational Television affiliate KETA-TV (channel 13, now a PBS member station), which the Oklahoma Educational Television Authority (OETA) signed on as Oklahoma's first educational television station on April 13, 1956. Channel 25's programming—which originally ran Monday through Fridays for seven hours per day, from 8:00 a.m. to 4:00 p.m.—consisted mainly of instructional and lecture-based telecourse programs developed or acquired in cooperation with the Oklahoma State Department of Education, which offered the course subjects attributable for college credit. Unlike KETA, which offered educational programming year-round (at least, during prime time through NET and later PBS), KOKH only offered programming during the academic year, temporarily suspending broadcasting operations during the district's designated summer break period.

In the summer of 1970, KOKH became the last television station in the Oklahoma City market to transmit programming in color, after RCA color transmission equipment—including three studio cameras, two videotape recorders, two film systems and two switchers—worth around $500,000 was donated to the school district. By that time, Channel 25 expanded its schedule to nine hours per day (from 10:00 a.m. to 6:00 p.m.). Operational expenses led to cutbacks in its daily programming schedule for the 1975–76 school year, reducing its schedule to six hours per day (from 10:00 a.m. to 2:00 p.m.) and suspending programming on Fridays entirely. Programming gradually expanded beginning in the 1976–77 school year, adding two extra hours of instructional programs during the mid-afternoon as well as some off-network syndicated series (such as Leave It to Beaver, Timmy and Lassie, Man Without a Gun and The Munsters) in the late afternoon as part of a re-expanded nine-hour-long schedule. By September 1977, KOKH began offering prime time programs, consisting of science and documentary series and some adult education programs until sign-off. At that time, its broadcast day was expanded to thirteen hours per day (from 9:00 a.m. to 10:00 p.m.); the station also began operating on weekends for the first time in its history, resuming a Friday schedule after two years and launching a limited schedule of instructional programs on Saturday and Saturdays during the morning and midday hours (from 8:00 a.m. to 1:00 p.m.).

As a commercial independent station

In the fall of 1978, Oklahoma City Public Schools declared its intent to sell KOKH-TV, intending to redirect the money it funneled into the television station to raise teacher salaries. The school district cited the station's operating expenses (which averaged $300,000 per year) for its decision, claiming that those outran any benefits that KOKH had to the district; it had also struggled to raise $350,000 in matching funds to replace the station's aging transmitter and broadcast tower. Internal studies also indicated that schoolteachers within the district seldom had used KOKH's instructional programs for classroom credit. In Oklahoma City Public Schools' favor was the fact that it had never formally requested that the UHF channel 25 allocation—which had officially been reserved by the FCC for commercial use—be reclassified to non-commercial status upon acquiring the permit from Republic Television and Radio. The Oklahoma City area had also grown to a population large enough that a commercial independent station could now viably operate, making it possible for the school district to sell the KOKH license to a commercial television station operator. On December 14, 1978, New York City-based John Blair & Co. purchased the KOKH-TV license for $3.5 million; Blair outbid two groups that were also competing for the UHF channel 14 allocation at that time, commercial broadcaster The Outlet Company and the noncommercial religious Trinity Broadcasting Network (which would sign on KTBO-TV on channel 14 in March 1981). The sale to Blair was approved by the FCC on June 6, 1979; since Oklahoma City Public Schools had let out regular classes for its designated summer break period, KOKH had suspended programming as normal during the summer months—while extending that period by five weeks during the transfer process—as the sale was being completed.

On October 1, 1979, when Blair formally took over channel 25's operations, KOKH was converted into a commercial independent station, the first such station in the state of Oklahoma. (OETA flagship KETA-TV concurrently became Oklahoma City's sole educational television outlet.) The station's first broadcast as a commercial independent was a special 30-minute program inaugurating KOKH's new format at 6:00 a.m. that morning; this was followed by the station's first entertainment program, the syndicated children's show New Zoo Revue. It adopted a general entertainment format typical of a UHF-based independent, initially carrying a mix of cartoons, classic sitcoms, religious programs, some sports programming, and certain network programs preempted by NBC affiliate KTVY (channel 4, now KFOR-TV), ABC affiliate KOCO-TV (channel 5), and CBS affiliate KWTV (channel 9) to carry local or syndicated programming. (Among the preempted network shows carried by KOKH as an independent station were Search for Tomorrow, which KTVY preempted from April 1982—following the soap opera's move to NBC from CBS—until September 1985, and Nightline, which ABC contracted KOKH-TV to show live-to-air from September 1983 to February 1985, after KOCO attempted to push the newsmagazine to a post-midnight slot to accommodate off-network syndicated sitcoms that it was already airing after its 10:00 p.m. newscast as well as its acquisition of the short-lived syndicated talk show Thicke of the Night.) The station also heavily incorporated feature films onto its schedule, to such an extent that, from 1979 to 1986, KOKH promoted itself as "Oklahoma's Great[est] Movie Station"; KOKH usually carried four films per day—two each in the afternoon, and one to two films per night in prime time—Monday through Friday, and five to six films per day each weekend.

KOKH gained a competitor four weeks later on October 28, when Seraphim Media signed on the similarly formatted KGMC-TV (channel 34, now CW-affiliated sister station KOCB). This was followed by the launch of KAUT (channel 43) by Golden West Broadcasters on October 15, 1980, which initially featured programming from subscription service Video Entertainment Unlimited (VEU) at night as well as on weekend afternoons. (Three weeks later on November 3, KAUT added a rolling news format as well as a limited schedule of syndicated entertainment programs during the daytime hours on weekdays.) In May 1980, the station relocated its operations into a new  studio facility on East Wilshire Boulevard and Northeast 78th Street in northeast Oklahoma City; its transmitter facilities were also relocated to a  transmission tower that was built adjacent to the studio building. During the early 1980s, KOKH signed on eight low-power UHF translators (in Elk City, Hollis, Erick, Strong City, Woodward, Ponca City and Ardmore) to extend its over-the-air coverage throughout the western two-thirds of Oklahoma and (via a repeater in Quanah) far northwest Texas.

Because of its status as the strongest of Oklahoma City market's three commercial independents, in the spring of 1986, KOKH was approached by News Corporation to become a charter affiliate of the fledgling Fox Broadcasting Company. Station management turned the offer down because Fox's request that its inaugural program, The Late Show Starring Joan Rivers, be aired at 10:00 p.m. (when the station's second scheduled film of the evening would normally be in progress at the time) would have caused disruption to its prime time double feature strategy. On July 25, Fox reached an agreement with KAUT (then owned by Rollins Communications) to serve as the network's Oklahoma City affiliate.

In July 1986, John Blair & Co. was approached by private equity firm Reliance Capital Group to initiate a friendly takeover of the group; Reliance offered to acquire 61% of the common shares held by Blair for $31 per share, and exchange the remaining shares for a 15-year debenture at a face value of $20.75 per share; Blair also offered to pay a $1.50 dividend on each of the unacquired shares, pending completion of the Reliance acquisition. Blair and Co. considered the offer to prevent a hostile takeover by minority stockholder Macfadden Holdings, amid conflicting ideological concerns expressed by company shareholders over Macfadden's ownership of adult-oriented publications (McFadden planned to use the proceeds from its 1985 sale of pornographic magazine Cheri to take full control of Blair). On November 5, in a corporate restructuring to focus on expanding its Spanish language network NetSpan (now Telemundo) and to pay off debt incurred by the Reliance purchase, Blair and Co. sold KOKH, and NBC affiliates KSBW-TV in Salinas and KSBY in San Luis Obispo, California to Nashville-based Gillett Communications for $86 million; the sale received FCC approval on December 30, and was finalized on December 31. Gillett subsequently transferred KOKH, Fox affiliate WRLH-TV in Richmond, Virginia, NBC affiliate WEAU-TV in Eau Claire, Wisconsin, and CBS affiliates KOLN in Lincoln, Nebraska—as well as Grand Island satellite KGIN—and WWMT in Kalamazoo, Michigan to Busse Broadcast Communications (founded by former Gillett president Lawrence A. Busse, and operated as a trust company held by the children of George N. Gillett) to address ownership issues related to Gillett's purchase of a majority stake in Storer Communications. The transaction received FCC approval on July 31, 1987, and was finalized on August 27.

Aborted sale to Pappas Telecasting
Despite just barely ranking as a top-40 Nielsen market at the time, the Oklahoma City market did not have enough television-viewing households to support what were essentially three independent stations, nor was there a supply of programming on the syndication market that could sufficiently fill their respective schedules. In the summer of 1988, Visalia, California-based Pappas Telecasting Companies proposed a deal with Busse to purchase KOKH. The complex $30-million asset transfer proposal would have resulted in Pappas acquiring the programming inventories of both KGMC and KAUT (including channel 43's Fox affiliation rights) and integrating many of their acquired programs onto channel 25's schedule, solidifying the station's status as Oklahoma City's dominant independent. Simultaneously, Seraphim Media would donate the license and certain intellectual assets of KGMC to the OETA—with the intent of converting it into a secondary PBS station—for $1 million, with Pappas acquiring equipment and property assets owned by the station for an additional $1 million. Heritage Media (through its Rollins Communications subsidiary) would sell KAUT to a religious broadcaster in turn, which would convert that station to a non-commercial religious format. Governor Henry Bellmon voiced concerns with OETA's involvement in the transaction, suggesting that the purchase of a second Oklahoma City station would result in the authority—which had reported to the legislature that it had limited appropriations to adequately operate its existing stations as it stood—constantly requesting additional funding for the state network and a secondary Oklahoma City station.

On August 17, 1988, OETA submitted an FCC application to purchase KGMC, after, in advance of a fundraising deadline set for that date, Pappas offered to provide a $1 million contribution toward purchasing the station, contingent upon the company completing the KOKH purchase. The National Black Media Coalition filed a petition asking for the FCC to deny the transaction, contending that OETA was not qualified to acquire KGMC (which had been the center of an investigation into disgraced stock trader Ivan Boesky's improper transference of his majority share of the station's parent company to his wife) under an FCC policy allowing stations facing revocation of their licenses to be sold to a group led by women or minorities at 75% of their market value. After the KGMC proposal was voted down by OETA's board of directors that September, Seraphim Media chose to sell KGMC to Cleveland, Ohio-based Maddox Broadcasting Corp.—which would have refocused that station to primarily refocus a mix of religious and Home Shopping Network (HSN) programming—for $3.6 million, including $2.6 million in intellectual assets (such as transmitter facilities, studio equipment and licenses) that would not be acquired by Pappas. Then on November 1, Heritage Media announced it would sell KAUT to the OETA for $9.25 million in assets, with Pappas agreeing to lease KAUT's transmitter facility to OETA for 25 years for an annual $1 operating fee plus an additional $1 million contribution should the acquisition be completed.

On September 12, Pappas Telecasting announced that it would purchase KOKH from Busse for $9 million, plus the assumption of liabilities totaling up to $7 million. The company also planned to change the station's call letters to KOKC-TV. (The KOKC calls are now used by a news/talk radio station on 1520 AM.) Although OETA planned to fund the conversion of channel 43 partly through start-up grants (including a $75,000 award by KOCO-TV management), in a move that hamstrung its attempt to acquire KAUT, the Oklahoma Legislature incorporated stipulations into the bill appropriating OETA's funding for FY1990 that prohibited the use of state funds "for any operational or capital expense of the proposed second educational television channel in Oklahoma City" and from proposing any additional funding to finance the acquisition if it did not obtain sufficient funding from private sources. In late January 1989, Busse management denied Pappas' request to extend the completion deadline for the purchase past its scheduled January 31 deadline. The entire transaction fell through on February 3, when Busse formally terminated the purchase agreement with Pappas. Just three days earlier, the FCC had also dismissed the respective transfer applications for KGMC and KAUT.

As a Fox affiliate

On April 23, 1991, Heritage Media announced its intent to purchase KOKH-TV from Busse Broadcast Communications for $7 million. In a transaction that borrowed certain elements of the earlier Pappas proposal, the deal—which was contingent on approval of Heritage's acquisition of channel 25—would result in KAUT's license, transmitter and master control equipment being donated to OETA, which would be given a two-year option to purchase the rest of KAUT's assets for $1.5 million. The transaction received FCC approval on June 27, and was finalized on August 12. As a consequence of Heritage electing to transfer the local Fox affiliation rights and some of the acquired programming inventory belonging to KAUT in the deal, channel 25 became a Fox affiliate—concurrently branding as "KOKH Fox 25"—on August 15, 1991. The transfer also resulted in the station hiring 30 former KAUT employees (including departing channel 43 general manager, Harlan Reams, who was appointed to that same post at KOKH), and acquired other equipment and intellectual property belonging to KAUT. Meanwhile, OETA—under a broadcasting pilot initiative between Heritage, the OETA Board of Directors, the OETA Foundation Board of Trustees, PBS, and Children's Television Workshop management, and funded in part with private contributions—switched channel 43 to an educational format that featured a mix of PBS programming and programs acquired from the public television syndication market repurposed from the OETA state network as well as additional children's, lifestyle and telecourse programs acquired by OETA exclusively for channel 43's schedule. (Channel 43, which adopted the KTLC call letters in January 1992, later reverted to an entertainment format as UPN affiliate KPSG in June 1998, following OETA's sale of the station to the Paramount Stations Group.)

For its first two years as a Fox affiliate, KOKH was programmed as a de facto independent station, albeit not to the same extent as many Fox stations were in the years following the network's October 1986 launch. (In September 1990, eleven months before the network disaffiliated from KAUT, Fox—which had been offering programming on Saturday and Sunday evenings since it expanded into prime time in the spring of 1987—had expanded its schedule to Thursday and Friday nights, leaving affiliates with three nights of programming time to fill until the network began offering prime time programming on additional nights.) Still, until Fox began offering programming on a nightly basis—with the addition of programming on Tuesday and Wednesday evenings—in January 1993, KOKH continued to air a movie at 7:00 p.m. on nights when the network did not offer prime time programs. However, it gradually became less reliant on movies during this period, as the growing cable television industry began to impact the ability of broadcast stations to acquire film content. Channel 25 would also rely on the network's Fox Kids block for its children's programming inventory, resulting in many syndicated children's programs that KOKH had aired to occupy portions of the weekday daytime and Saturday morning time periods being relegated to early morning time slots as well as around the morning and afternoon network blocks.

On March 17, 1997, News Corporation announced that it would purchase Heritage Media for $1.35 billion. Unlike most of the company's acquisition deals throughout the 1990s, News Corporation was not interested in Heritage's broadcast operations, but in its ActMedia division, which specialized in in-supermarket marketing that would complement News America Marketing's SmartSource Sunday newspaper coupon circular. Taking on Heritage's broadcast operations would have put News Corporation over the defined 35% national market reach for an individual television station owner of that time. (The company's Fox Television Stations subsidiary had operated 22 Fox owned-and-operated stations and one independent station at the time, including twelve that it had just recently acquired through its purchase of New World Communications.)

Sinclair ownership
On July 16, 1997, Hunt Valley, Maryland-based Sinclair Broadcast Group announced that it would buy Heritage's television and radio stations from News Corporation for $630 million. However, the deal would create ownership conflicts between the television stations that Sinclair and Heritage each ran in several cities—among them, then-UPN affiliate KOCB, which Sinclair had acquired from Superior Communications in 1996. At the time, the FCC restricted broadcasters from owning more than one commercial television station in any market; however, since the agency did not count such agreements as de facto ownership, Sinclair formed local marketing agreements—a concept originated in the radio industry that it brought to television through the formation of a virtual duopoly between Fox affiliate WPGH-TV and independent station WPTT (now MyNetworkTV affiliate WPNT) in Pittsburgh in 1991—to operate stations that it could not own legally in other markets. Through a series of sales made to address antitrust concerns raised by the U.S. Department of Justice's San Francisco field office over the deal, on August 7, 1997, Sinclair sold channel 25 to Sullivan Broadcast Holdings for $60 million.

On February 4, 1998, three days after Sullivan finalized the KOKH purchase, Sinclair exercised an option to purchase channel 25 from Sullivan for $60 million. (Sinclair later purchased Sullivan's 13 other television stations for $100 million in cash and debt on February 24; this separate transaction was finalized on July 1.) Under the terms of the deal, Sinclair entered into a time brokerage agreement (TBA) with Sullivan—which the company retained as a separate entity to operate KOKH and three other Sullivan-owned Fox affiliates, WTAT-TV in Charleston, South Carolina, WVAH-TV in Charleston, West Virginia and WRGT-TV in Dayton, Ohio—to assume operational responsibilities for KOKH. This arrangement placed KOKH in the unusual position of being the junior partner in a virtual duopoly with an affiliate of the lower-rated WB network, of which KOCB had become an affiliate in January 1998. (A Big Four network affiliate normally serves as the senior partner in most virtual or legal duopolies involving an affiliate of a mid-major or smaller network.)

In March 1998, Sinclair announced its intent to sell KOKH and the rights to the TBA involving KOCB to Glencairn, Ltd., under a sale option exercised by the latter group. The family of Sinclair founder Julian Sinclair Smith—led by his widow, Carolyn Smith, who would assume full control of Glencairn from founder and original president Edwin Edwards, a former Sinclair executive, two years later—owned 97% of Glencairn's stock, which would have effectively made the KOKH/KOCB operation a duopoly in violation of FCC rules of the time. Glencairn—which was to be paid with Sinclair stock for the purchases—owned eleven television stations throughout the United States that Sinclair operated under local marketing agreements. This prompted Rainbow/PUSH, a civil rights organization headed by Jesse Jackson, to file petitions asking the FCC to deny approval of the transaction, citing concerns over a single company holding two broadcast licenses in one market and arguing that Glencairn passed itself off as a minority-owned company—Edwards, who was also principal owner of Glencairn, is African American—while acting as an arm of Sinclair, and used the LMA to gain control of the station. Kelley International Licensing, a subsidiary of KWTV owner Griffin Television, also filed a complaint on similar grounds.

On November 17, 1999, Sinclair restructured the deal to acquire KOKH from Sullivan Broadcasting directly as part of a $53.2 million cash and debt forgiveness acquisition involving four other stations—Mission Broadcasting-owned UPN affiliates WUXP-TV (now a MyNetworkTV affiliate) in Nashville and WUPN-TV (now MyNetworkTV affiliate WMYV) in Greensboro, North Carolina, and Montecito Broadcast Group-owned independent station KFBT (now CW affiliate KVCW) in Las Vegas—along with acquiring five Glencairn stations—WB affiliates KRRT (now CW affiliate KMYS) in San Antonio and WVTV (now a CW affiliate) in Milwaukee, and UPN affiliates WBSC-TV (now MyNetworkTV affiliate WMYA-TV) in Anderson, South Carolina, WRDC (now a MyNetworkTV affiliate) in Raleigh–Durham and WABM (now a MyNetworkTV affiliate) in Birmingham—in an all-stock purchase worth $8 million. The Glencairn transaction was dismissed by the FCC per Sinclair's request on July 23, 2001; the sale of the Sullivan stations to Sinclair was approved by FCC on December 10 and was finalized on December 14, resulting in KOKH and KOCB becoming the Oklahoma City market's first legal television duopoly. Although it voted to approve the Sullivan purchase, the FCC issued a $40,000 fine against Sinclair on grounds it controlled Glencairn in violation of the agency's local ownership rules. However, as noted in a 2003 ruling on the matter by the United States Court of Appeals for the District of Columbia Circuit, the issue involving KOKH was rendered somewhat moot, as on August 5, 1999, the FCC began allowing broadcasters the ability to form duopolies between television stations, provided that eight independent owners remain in a market once a duopoly is formed and one of the properties does not rank among the market's four highest-rated stations. KOCB subsequently relocated its operations from its original studios on Northeast 85th Street (near East Britton Road and North Eastern Avenue) into KOKH's Wilshire Boulevard facility ( south-southwest of the former KOCB building).

In April 1998, after NBC affiliate KTEN dropped its secondary affiliations with ABC and Fox, KOKH—which was widely available on cable providers throughout south-central Oklahoma—became the default Fox affiliate for the Oklahoma side of the Sherman–Ada media market, including the cities of Ardmore and Durant. (Cable subscribers on the Texas side of the market received Fox programming via Dallas–Fort Worth O&O KDFW, a former CBS affiliate that switched to Fox in July 1995 through the affiliation agreement between the network and then-KDFW-owner New World.) Because the Sherman–Ada market did not have enough commercial television stations to allow it to maintain an exclusive affiliation, Fox would not regain an over-the-air affiliate in that area until September 2006, when CBS affiliate KXII launched a digital subchannel affiliated with the network.

During the late 1990s, KOKH lessened its reliance on running cartoons and classic sitcoms, and began acquiring more talk shows, reality series and court shows; more recent sitcoms remained as part of its schedule, although these were gradually relegated to the early access and nighttime hours. After Fox discontinued the Fox Kids weekday lineup in December 2001, KOKH continued to air the children's block's remaining Saturday morning lineup (which was relaunched as FoxBox in September 2002, and later rebranded it as 4Kids TV in September 2005; Fox ceased providing children's programming within its schedule in December 2008, when the network declined to renew its agreement with time-lease partner 4Kids Entertainment). The station's weekday 10:00 a.m. to 5:00 p.m. schedule subsequently began to largely focus around syndicated court shows (such as Divorce Court, Judge Mathis and The People's Court); this reliance on the genre reached to the extent that KOKH aired every court show available in syndication during the 2006–07 season. In September 2002, KOKH de-emphasized the "Fox 25" branding, opting to alternatively identify the station verbally as either "Fox Oklahoma City" or "Oklahoma City's Fox" in on-air promotions (though it retained its existing logo referencing the station's over-the-air position on channel 25); KOKH reverted to using the "Fox 25" branding full-time in 2006. On March 5, 2012, KOKH and KOCB became the sixth and seventh (and last) television stations in the Oklahoma City market to begin transmitting syndicated programs and local commercials (including station promos) in high definition.

Averted loss of Fox affiliation; aborted sale to Standard Media
On May 8, 2017, Sinclair entered into an agreement to acquire Tribune Media—which owned KFOR-TV and independent station KAUT-TV since December 2013—for $3.9 billion, plus the assumption of $2.7 billion in debt held by Tribune. Because Sinclair and Tribune each owned two television stations in the Oklahoma City market, with KFOR and KOKH both ranking among the market's four highest-rated stations in total day viewership, the companies were required to sell either KOKH or KFOR (and optionally, KOCB and KAUT) to another station owner in order to comply with FCC local ownership rules. On August 2, 2017, reports surfaced that 21st Century Fox was proposing a deal in which its Fox Television Stations division and Ion Media would contribute their respective stations into a joint venture, in which Fox programming would be shifted from as many as 26 Sinclair stations to the Ion-owned stations in markets where Sinclair and Tribune's stations conflict. As the initial deal would have combined Sinclair's 38 existing affiliates and Tribune's 14 Fox affiliates (comprising 28% of the network's national affiliate reach, with the bulk based among the top-50 markets), this proposal was seen as a tactic to place pressure on Sinclair to abandon the acquisition or to limit the group's reverse compensation leverage in future contract negotiations by forcing it to sell certain Fox stations involved, in exchange for renewing affiliation agreements that were set to expire at the end of 2017. The chances of KOKH keeping its Fox affiliation increased somewhat in October 2017 when Ion elected its stations to have must-carry status—which only applies to a station's main feed, allowing Fox to possibly affiliate with a digital subchannel of Ion O&O KOPX-TV (channel 62) and other Ion-owned stations—for a three-year period, instead of retransmission consent.

On April 24, 2018, in an amendment to the Tribune acquisition through which it proposed the sale of certain stations to both independent and affiliated third-party companies to curry the DOJ's approval, Sinclair announced that it would sell KOKH-TV and eight other stations—Sinclair-operated WRLH-TV, KDSM-TV in Des Moines, WOLF-TV (along with LMA partners WSWB and WQMY) in Scranton–Wilkes-Barre and WXLV-TV in Greensboro–Winston-Salem–High Point, and Tribune-owned WPMT in Harrisburg and WXMI in Grand Rapids—to Standard Media Group (an independent broadcast holding company formed by private equity firm Standard General to assume ownership of and absolve ownership conflicts involving the aforementioned stations) for $441.1 million. Upon completion of the Tribune purchase, Sinclair was to have retained ownership of KOCB and form a new legal duopoly with KFOR-TV as part of a proposed virtual triopoly with KAUT-TV (which, to comply with FCC rules prohibiting common ownership of more than two full-power stations in a single market, was to have been sold to affiliate company Howard Stirk Holdings for $750,000 and enter into shared services and joint sales agreements with Sinclair). However, Sinclair would have continued to operate KOCB and KOKH together under a transitional services agreement for six months after the sale's completion.

Less than one month after the FCC voted to have the deal reviewed by an administrative law judge amid "serious concerns" about Sinclair's forthrightness in its applications to sell certain conflict properties, on August 9, 2018, Tribune announced it would terminate the Sinclair deal; it concurrently filed a breach of contract lawsuit in the Delaware Chancery Court, alleging that Sinclair engaged in protracted negotiations with the FCC and the DOJ over regulatory issues, refused to sell stations in markets where it already had properties (such as KAUT-TV), and proposed divestitures to parties with ties to Sinclair executive chair David D. Smith that were rejected or highly subject to rejection to maintain control over stations it was required to sell. Standard Media's purchase of KOKH and the other six Tribune- and Sinclair-operated spin-off stations was also effectively terminated as that deal was predicated on the closure of the Sinclair–Tribune merger. (Tribune—which retained ownership of KFOR and KAUT in the interim—would later sell most of its assets to the Nexstar Media Group.)

Subchannel history

KOKH-DT2
KOKH-DT2 is the Charge!-affiliated second digital subchannel of KOKH-TV, broadcasting in widescreen standard definition on UHF digital channel 24.2 (or virtual channel 25.2).

In August 2010, Sinclair signed a groupwide affiliation deal with country music-oriented digital subchannel service The Country Network (later renamed ZUUS Country, before reverting to its original name) to the 28 of the company's stations. On November 4 of that year, KOKH-TV launched a digital subchannel on virtual channel 25.2 to serve as an affiliate of The Country Network; ZUUS Country was replaced by Grit on December 31, 2014, as part of a multi-station affiliation agreement between Sinclair Broadcast Group and network parent Katz Broadcasting. On February 28, 2017, KOKH-DT2 disaffiliated from Grit to become a charter outlet of the similarly formatted Charge!, a movie-focused action-adventure network owned as a joint venture between Sinclair and MGM Television.

KOKH-DT3
KOKH-DT3 is the Stadium-affiliated third digital subchannel of KOKH-TV, broadcasting in widescreen standard definition on UHF digital channel 24.3 (or virtual channel 25.3).

On December 8, 2014, KOKH launched a digital subchannel on virtual channel 25.3, which became an affiliate of WeatherNation TV; the subchannel subsequently began to be carried by Cox Communications on digital channel 219. On November 1, 2017, the subchannel became an affiliate of Stadium. (KOKH-DT3 continued to share the Stadium affiliation with Enid-licensed KBZC-LD [channel 42], which had served as the Sinclair-Silver Chalice sports network venture's Oklahoma City affiliate since the network's launch, until November 2018, when its primary feed switched to infomercial service OnTV4U.)

Programming
KOKH-TV currently carries the entirety of Fox's programming schedule, although it may preempt some network programs to provide long-form breaking news or severe weather coverage when necessary. While channel 25 occasionally rebroadcasts the preempted Fox programs on tape delay in place of its regular late-night programming, in recent years, station personnel has instructed viewers to instead watch them on Fox's proprietary streaming platforms (including its website, mobile app or the Fox Now streaming service), Hulu, or its cable/satellite video-on-demand service the day after their initial airing. From September 10, 2016- October 9, 2021, KOKH had  carried Xploration Station, a Steve Rotfeld Productions-distributed educational program block that is syndicated primarily to Fox stations; the station airs the block's first two hours on Saturday mornings (leading into Fox's Weekend Marketplace infomercial block) and the final hour on Sunday mornings. (The block originally aired on MyNetworkTV affiliate KSBI [channel 52] for the two years following its September 2014 premiere, as Sinclair's existing syndication contracts with individual educational program distributors prevented KOKH from carrying Xploration Station, prior to an agreement with Rotfeld that expanded the block's clearance to Sinclair's Fox affiliates beginning with the 2016–17 season until 2020–21 season.)

Syndicated programs broadcast by KOKH-TV include Live with Kelly and Ryan, The Wendy Williams Show, The People's Court, Divorce Court, TMZ, Modern Family, Last Man Standing, Two and a Half Men, Seinfeld and Judge Judy. The station also produces Living Oklahoma, an hour-long talk and lifestyle program – airing weekday mornings at 10:00 a.m. – which premiered on October 5, 2015; the program is  hosted by weekday morning feature reporter Malcolm Tubbs and traffic reporter Shelby Love (who also co-host OKCW, a weeknightly lifestyle/business segment for sister station KOCB).

KOKH and KOCB served as the flagship stations for the Oklahoma Lottery beginning with the inaugural evening drawings of its Pick 3 and Cash 5 games on November 10, 2005. For the entirety of the duopoly's contract with the Oklahoma Lottery Commission, live drawings – which aired live at 9:20 p.m. nightly (following the "B" block of the 9:00 newscast) and simulcast on KOCB – originated from KOKH/KOCB's Wilshire Boulevard studios. (KOKH aired the drawings on tape delay on nights when Fox Sports event overruns delayed its prime time newscast.) Amid reductions to the Lottery Commission's budget, televised drawings for the Pick 3 and Cash 5 games were discontinued on June 30, 2009—upon switching the former two original online games to a random number generator structure—and results were moved exclusively to the Lottery's website. (A rundown of the winning numbers for all Oklahoma Lottery games, including the multi-state Hot Lotto, continued to be shown during the 9:00 p.m. newscast until the end of 2013, and have aired since then via the news ticker shown during KOKH's morning and midday newscasts.) In January 2006, when Oklahoma became a participant in the multi-state lottery, the station began airing Powerball drawings each Wednesday and Saturday; Mega Millions drawings—previously seen in the Oklahoma City market only through WGN America (now NewsNation), which discontinued national carriage of the live Powerball and Mega Millions drawings in 2013—were eventually added once Oklahoma became a participant in that multi-state lottery in January 2011.

Sports programming
As an independent station, during the early and mid-1980s, KOKH carried some locally produced and syndicated sporting events. During the early and mid-1980s, the station also produced select rodeo competitions held in Oklahoma City (including the National Finals Rodeo) through its "Studio 25" production unit. In August 1983, KOKH became the first television station in the U.S. to air syndicated National Football League (NFL) preseason games outside of the home markets of the individual teams (carrying games involving the Dallas Cowboys, Washington Redskins, Kansas City Chiefs and San Diego Chargers that year), which the station aired on a day-behind basis.

In October 1983, KOKH reached an agreement with MetroSports, a sports syndication service created as a joint venture between Anheuser-Busch and Katz Communications, to acquire the local television rights to broadcast college basketball games from the Big Eight Conference (which evolved into the Big XII in 1996). The package—which gave the station local rights to televise games involving the Oklahoma Sooners and the Oklahoma State Cowboys, whose games had respectively been carried by NBC affiliate KTVY and independent station KAUT through the 1982–83 season—consisted of Saturday afternoon games and select prime time games (held either on Tuesday or Wednesday nights, depending on the game scheduled to air) during the NCAA Division I Basketball season.

Sports programming on KOKH-TV is  sourced mainly through Fox Sports. From  September 1994, when Fox formally assumed primary broadcast rights to the National Football Conference (NFC) from CBS, until January 2020, KOKH served as the Dallas Cowboys' television partner for the Oklahoma City market, providing it the local rights to various team-related programs during the regular season (including the Cowboys Postgame Show, Special Edition with Jerry Jones and the head coach's weekly analysis program, along with specials such as the Making of the Dallas Cowboys Cheerleaders Calendar and postseason team reviews). In addition to carrying Fox-televised games involving in-conference opponents, since 2014, Cowboys games carried on KOKH include certain cross-flexed games against American Football Conference (AFC) opponents that CBS was originally scheduled to televise. (Through the duopoly's agreement with the team's syndication service, sister station KOCB also held local broadcast rights to Cowboys preseason games not televised by Fox or the NFL's other broadcast and cable partners.) KFOR-TV replaced KOKH/KOCB as the Cowboys' official Oklahoma City broadcaster in August 2020.

Since August 2011, when Fox assumed partial over-the-air rights to the Big 12 Conference, KOKH has carried select Sooners and Cowboys college football games not carried locally by KOCO-TV (via the Big 12's primary over-the-air rightsholder, ABC) or by regional sports cable network Fox Sports Oklahoma (which, along with the other Fox Sports Networks outlets acquired from interim parent The Walt Disney Company, became a sister property to KOKH through a joint venture between Sinclair and Diamond Sports Group in July 2019). On weeks when Sooners or Cowboys games are carried by channel 25, the station's sports department produces local pre-game or post-game shows—varying depending on Fox's college football schedule for the week of the scheduled game—wrapping around the scheduled Fox telecast.

News operation
, KOKH presently broadcasts 39½ hours of locally produced newscasts each week (with 7½ hours each weekday, and one hour each on weekends). In addition, the station produces the sports highlight and discussion program Fox 25 Sports Sunday (hosted by sports director Myron Patton, sports anchor Curtis Fitzpatrick, and WWLS-FM [98.1] radio host Jim Traber), which airs Sundays at 10:00 p.m., as well as a 15-minute sports wrap-up segment—which is treated as a standalone program—that airs nightly during the final two segments of Fox 25 News at 9:00.

Through a content agreement with Cumulus Media, KOKH's StormWatch Weather staff provides local weather updates and, in the event of significant severe weather situations (such as a tornado warning) affecting the area, audio simulcasts of long-form severe weather coverage for Cumulus's Oklahoma City radio cluster: WWLS-FM, KYIS (98.9 FM), KATT-FM (100.5), KKWD (104.9 FM), KQOB (96.9 FM) and KWPN (640 AM). KOKH's newscasts regularly place fourth among the market's news-producing stations, behind local news and network programs on KFOR, KOCO and KWTV, although its morning and 9:00 p.m. newscasts tend to beat the KFOR-produced newscasts on KAUT.

News department history
Starting from its October 1, 1979, relaunch as a commercial independent station, news programming on KOKH initially consisted mainly of 30-second-long newsbriefs—consisting of Associated Press wire reports and a short weather forecast read by the anchor on-call—that aired on an hourly basis during select commercial breaks within daytime and evening programs. On September 22, 1980, KOKH restructured the newsbriefs under a more flexible format that allowed routine updates to air at any time; rechristened Newstouch 25, the updates—which lasted anywhere between 30 seconds and two minutes in length—initially aired daily from 7:30 a.m. until sign-off around 12:30 a.m. (later expanding to 6:00 a.m. to 1:30 a.m. by September 1982). Most of the newsbriefs were broadcast live, though some morning and late night updates were pre-recorded. Among those anchoring the updates were Ronnie Kaye (a former radio DJ at WKY [930 AM], who was hired by KOKH in August 1980 to serve as the station's Director of Information Services), Mike Monday (later known for being the pitchman for now-defunct local furniture/electronics store Sight and Sound), Karie Ross, Felicia Ferguson (winner of the 1985 Miss Oklahoma pageant), Janis Walkingstick and Kelly Ogle (now an evening anchor at KWTV).

From the time of the Newstouch relaunch until 1988, the station also produced Weathertouch 25, two-minute-long weather updates that aired on the half-hour during the broadcast day; the segments—featuring weathercasters such as Ross Dixon (former KOCO and eventual OETA meteorologist), Dan Satterfield, and Kevin Foreman (later a meteorologist at KFOR-TV)—utilized the first colorized radar scan converter and satellite picture colorizer in Oklahoma, as well as live radar data from the National Weather Service Terminal Doppler at Will Rogers World Airport. In addition, KOKH produced several public affairs and interview programs including Meet The Mayor (an interview program featuring discussions and viewer questions with the Mayor of Oklahoma City), Woman to Woman (which featured discussions about women's issues) and Sunday PM (a weekly talk show focusing on prominent people, issues and events in Oklahoma City). As a consequence of Heritage Media's transfer of KAUT's Fox affiliation, other programming assets and personnel to the station, KOKH discontinued its news and public affairs programming in the summer of 1991: Sunday PM ended its run after the July 28 broadcast, while the news and weather updates were discontinued three days later on July 31.

The discontinuance of the Newstouch 25 updates was the decision of then-president and general manager Harlan Reams, who felt that a fourth news operation could not compete against the established news departments of the local Big Three network affiliates (a stance he held while running KAUT and, before that, fellow Fox affiliate KSAS-TV in Wichita). Reams affirmed this position in a June 1994 interview with The Daily Oklahoman, stating that KOKH would not offer a regular newscast under his oversight, even with the likelihood that its ratings and revenue would increase once Fox took over the National Football Conference television contract that fall. During its early years with Fox, KOKH even preempted the Fox News Extra segment inserts (produced by New York City O&O WNYW) that aired during commercial breaks within Fox's prime time lineup, choosing to air station promotions in their place. However, in the months following the April 19, 1995 bombing of the Alfred P. Murrah Federal Building, as the network was planning the launch of both a cable news channel and affiliate video feed, Fox urged KOKH management to develop a full-scale news department. Reams—potentially out of concern that Fox, which was shuffling affiliations to major network stations in around 30 other markets, might move its programming to one of the market's major network affiliates or another willing commercial station if it denied the request—ultimately conceded and commenced plans to build the news operation in August 1995, with plans calling for the prime time newscast to premiere in the late spring of 1996. With the cooperation of Reams, his successor Steven Herman and news director Bob Schadel (who served as assistant news director at KOCO-TV from 1983 to 1995), the newscast was structured to match the "Fox attitude" in a bid to court younger viewers, but instituted a more conventional style—minimizing sensationalistic content—to appeal to area viewers.

KOKH's current news department launched on May 27, 1996, with the premiere of The Nine O'Clock News (retitled the Fox 25 Primetime News at Nine in November 2000, and later as Fox 25 News at 9:00 in October 2020). Originally airing Monday through Fridays for a half-hour, it was first anchored by Jack Bowen (who previously had anchoring stints at KOCO and KWTV, ending his second stint at the former in November 1995) and Burns Flat native Kirsten McIntyre (previously an anchor/reporter at KAUZ-TV in Wichita Falls). (Bowen and McIntyre had earlier co-hosted Ground Zero, a half-hour special—which aired on KOKH on February 27, 1996, four months before the newscast launched—that showed previously restricted footage recorded by first responders during the Murrah Building bombing's aftermath.) They were accompanied by chief meteorologist Tim Ross (who brought a quirky approach to his weather segments, even naming the extended forecast graphic, the "Fearless 5-Day Forecast") and sports director Mike Steely (a former colleague of McIntyre's while he was sports director at KAUZ, and who continued to work as a sports talk host at KEBC [1340 AM, now KGHM; the KEBC calls now reside on 1560 AM] after joining KOKH, before moving to WWLS [AM] [now KWPN] in 1998). Heritage Media and KOKH invested over $1 million into the new news operation. The station also converted its main "Studio 25" production studio at the Wilshire Boulevard facility into a "working newsroom" set similar in design to the "NewsPlex" set used by ABC affiliate KETV in Omaha from 1996 to 2015, and incorporated Avid nonlinear, Internet-based editing equipment, becoming one of the first stations in the United States to use the technology. (KOKH would move production of its newscasts to a renovated production stage within the building on April 13, 2014, with the debut of an HD-ready news set built by Devlin Design Group that features a dedicated weather center, several large widescreen monitors, and a multi-purpose area used for interviews, and the morning and Sports Sunday broadcasts).

As the market's first prime time newscast, KOKH held steady in the 9:00 p.m. timeslot, even with competition from network programs on KFOR, KOCO-TV and KWTV. The weeknight editions of the newscast were expanded to one hour on August 4, 1997 (at which point and until September 1998, it was referred to as The Nine O'Clock News Hour in on-air promotions and newscast opens and talent bumpers). This was followed by the addition of hour-long Sunday edition on September 12, 1999 (which originally debuted as an abbreviated, delayed half-hour broadcast on that night due to Fox's telecast of the 51st Primetime Emmy Awards), and an hour-long Saturday edition that premiered on October 2, 1999. Brad Wheelis and Colleen O'Quinn were hired to co-anchor the Friday and Saturday editions at that time (the two resigned in 2000 after failing to reach contract renewal terms). Prior to the expansion, hour-long editions of The Nine O'Clock News were only produced to cover significant breaking news events (such as for the death penalty sentencing of Murrah bombing conspirator Timothy McVeigh on June 13, 1997). To further cement its status as an alternative to KFOR, KWTV and KOCO's 35-minute 10:00 p.m. shows, news director Henry Chu (who replaced Schadel in the late summer of 1998) moved to expand the number of stories, including national and international items, incorporated into each night's broadcast than those covered on the market's other late newscasts.

Over time, however, the news department began experiencing heavy turnover with its on-air staff that continues to this day. Ross—who was replaced by the more conventional Chuck Bell—was fired in early 1999, citing that his style did not work in a serious weather market. Steely—who was replaced by then-sports reporter Zach Klein—resigned from KOKH in June 1999 over creative disagreements with station management and difficulties working two sports broadcasting jobs. Bowen and McIntyre continued to anchor together until November 2000, when Bowen left KOKH after his contract was not renewed by the station. Turnover in the news department was so significant that in 2000, the station temporarily used solo anchors for the weekday and weekend newscasts, while Bell conducted the weather segment seven nights a week. As is the case with competitor KOCO, the fairly heavy turnover that KOKH has experienced with its on-air staff has led to some unfamiliarity that some of its on-air personalities have in the market.

In late 2002, Sinclair Broadcast Group announced plans to launch News Central, a hybrid newscast format incorporating centralcasted national news and sports and local weather segments, alongside locally produced news segments, during evening newscasts on the group's news-producing outlets. When NewsCentral launched in January 2003, weather reports during the Friday and Saturday newscasts began to be produced out of production facilities at the ground floor of Sinclair's headquarters in Hunt Valley, Maryland; it also began carrying The Point (later titled Behind the Headlines), a one-minute conservative political commentary feature by Sinclair's then-vice president Mark Hyman. When the News Central inserts began airing daily with the March 31, 2003 edition of the 9:00 newscast, KOKH continued to maintain anchors, reporters and other news production staff based out of its Wilshire Boulevard studios to produce the local news segments. All weather and sports segments were produced out of the Sinclair headquarters full-time; accordingly, the station's weather and sports staff (including chief meteorologist Amy Gardner, weekend evening meteorologist Greg Whitworth, sports director Zach Klein, and sports anchor/reporters Ari Bergeron and Mark Ross) as well as eight other production employees with the news department were laid off. (Local sports headlines began being handled by the news anchor on duty.) The first time that KOKH programmed news outside its established 9:00 slot was on February 2, 2004, when it premiered the Fox 25 Late Edition, a half-hour weeknight 10:00 p.m. newscast (it is currently one of more than three dozen Fox stations in the U.S. that produces a newscast in the traditional late news timeslot, 10:00 p.m. in the Central Time Zone). In 2005, the station debuted Oklahoma's Most Wanted, a weekly segment based on the format of now-former Fox series America's Most Wanted that aired during the Saturday edition of the 9:00 p.m. newscast, which profiled wanted criminals being sought by law enforcement for various felonies.

Corporate cutbacks at the company's news operations caused Sinclair to shutter its News Central division on March 31, 2006. KOKH, one of the few non-Big Three affiliates that participated in the venture to retain their news department amid the cutbacks, expanded its on-air news staff in the wake of News Central's closure. Meteorologists Scott Padgett (who conducted weather segments for KOKH as a News Central staffer), and Greg Whitworth (who served as a weekend evening meteorologist at KOKH from 1999 until the outsourcing-induced layoffs) were hired to helm the rebooted weather department. KOKH's sports department was restarted that December, when Myron Patton (then a WWLS radio host, who also formerly served as a sports anchor at KOCO-TV from 1988 to 1994, and is currently the longest-serving member of KOKH's on-air news staff) and Liam McHugh were hired as sports anchors. KOKH concurrently launched Fox 25 Sports Sunday on December 4 as a 15-minute Sunday evening sports wrap-up program at 9:45 p.m. (Sports Sunday would be reformatted as a half-hour panel analysis program and move to 10:00 p.m. on March 25, 2007.)

News programming was extended to weekday mornings on April 9, 2007, with the premiere of the Fox 25 Morning News (retitled Good Day OK on January 28, 2017) as a three-hour broadcast from 6:00 to 9:00 a.m., displacing infomercials and syndicated children's programs that had previously aired in that time period. (The program would add a fourth hour at 5:00 a.m. on January 4, 2010.) Formatted as a mix of local and national news, weather updates and lifestyle features, it was initially anchored by Brent Weber (who would later serve as a sideline reporter for Oklahoma City Thunder game telecasts on Fox Sports Oklahoma) and Angie Mock, alongside meteorologist Jeff George (who was shifted to evenings, subsequently being promoted to his  as chief meteorologist, in February 2010) and feature reporter Lauren Richardson. The program was the first second local morning newscast in the market to run after 7:00 a.m., debuting ten years after KWTV's News 9 This Morning—which discontinued its 7:00 a.m. hour in January 2008 to comply with CBS's request that its affiliates clear The Early Show in its entirety—had expanded into the slot. On January 31, 2011, an hour-long 9:00 a.m. extension of the newscast, Good Day Oklahoma, debuted with a format focusing on news updates, discussions, interviews and community event information. (The 9:00 a.m. broadcast—which, on September 21, 2015, was integrated into the main Fox 25 Morning News broadcast—was replaced by Living Oklahoma on March 7, 2016, when KOKH moved the lifestyle program from its original 10:00 a.m. timeslot.)

In September 2007, the Equal Employment Opportunity Commission (EEOC) filed a racial and gender discrimination lawsuit against KOKH on behalf of Phyllis Williams (an assignment-turned-crime reporter at KOKH from the current news operation's launch in May 1996 until her departure in November 2007). The suit—which sought back compensation, and compensatory and punitive damages—claimed that Williams was paid a lower salary than white female reporters of similar comparability and male reporters of various races, and that station management did not offer her a new contract until several months after she filed a discrimination complaint with the EEOC in 2005. Through a settlement reached in March 2011, KOKH management awarded Williams $45,000 in damages and additional monetary consideration. On October 11, 2010, channel 25 became the first Oklahoma City area station to stream its local newscasts, breaking news and severe weather coverage on smartphone and other mobile devices.

On August 14, 2013, KOKH became the last remaining English-language station and the fourth in the Oklahoma City market overall to begin broadcasting its newscasts in high definition. On July 6, 2014, the station debuted The Middle Ground, a Sunday morning discussion program focusing on state and national political issues that was produced by the Oklahoma Council of Public Affairs; the program was cancelled in April 2015. Channel 25 first launched an early-evening newscast on September 1, 2014, when it premiered an hour-long, Monday-through-Friday 5:00 p.m. newscast, replacing sitcom reruns that had traditionally aired at that hour. The program—which is treated as two separate half-hour programs, and acts as a local alternative to national network newscasts aired on KFOR, KWTV and KOCO during the broadcast's second half-hour—evolved out of an online-only 5:00 newscast that KOKH began offering on its website on February 10, 2014. On March 7, 2016, concurrent with Living Oklahomas timeslot shift and the resulting removal of the fifth-hour extension of the morning newscast, the station launched an hour-long midday newscast at 11:00 a.m.; it was the first local newscast in the Oklahoma City market to air in that timeslot since KWTV's midday news ended an eight-month run as an 11:00 broadcast in September 1980.

Notable current on-air staff
 Jim Traber – commentator

Notable former on-air staff
 Mitch English – morning feature reporter/fill-in meteorologist/Living Oklahoma co-host (2014–2019)
 Liam McHugh – sports anchor (2007–2009; now with Turner Sports)
 Jessica Willey – reporter (1998–2000; now at KTRK-TV in Houston)

Technical information

Subchannels
The station's digital signal is multiplexed:

Analog-to-digital transition
KOKH-TV discontinued regular programming on its analog signal, over UHF channel 25, on February 17, 2009, to conclude the federally mandated transition from analog to digital television. The station's digital signal remained on its pre-transition UHF channel 24, using PSIP to display KOKH-TV's virtual channel as 25 on digital television receivers.

As part of the SAFER Act, KOKH kept its analog signal on the air until March 3 to inform viewers of the digital television transition through a loop of public service announcements from the National Association of Broadcasters.

ATSC 3.0 deployment
On October 8, 2020, KOKH commenced ATSC 3.0 digital transmissions over the signal of local NextGen TV host station KAUT-TV; the KOKH/KOCB duopoly was among five Oklahoma City-area stations owned by broadcasters associated with the Pearl NextGen TV consortium—accompanied by the duopoly of NBC affiliate KFOR-TV and independent station KAUT-TV (owned by Nexstar Media Group), and ABC affiliate KOCO-TV (owned by Hearst Television)—that deployed the fledgling ATSC 3.0 standard on that date. The station's 3.0 signal—which, rather than transmitting KOKH's primary channel, uses KOKH-DT2 as the station's designated 3.0 feed—transmits over UHF digital channel 19.5003, using PSIP to display KOKH's virtual channel as 25.2 on digital television receivers; KOKH, in turn, hosts the ATSC 1.0 signals of KAUT-DT2 (on UHF channel 24.6, remapped to virtual channel 43.2) and KAUT-DT3 (on UHF channel 24.7, remapped to virtual channel 43.3).

Translators
To reach viewers throughout the 34 counties comprising the Oklahoma City Designated Market Area, KOKH-TV extends its over-the-air coverage area through a network of nine low-power digital translator stations – all of which transmit using PSIP virtual channel 25 – encompassing much of Western Oklahoma that distribute its programming beyond the  range of its broadcast signal.

Notes

References

External links
  - KOKH-TV official website
 cwokc.com - KOCB official website

Fox network affiliates
Charge! (TV network) affiliates
Stadium (sports network) affiliates
Sinclair Broadcast Group
Television channels and stations established in 1959
OKH-TV
1959 establishments in Oklahoma